Care Inspectorate may refer to:
 Care Inspectorate (Flanders), a Belgian government department for health and welfare services
 Care Inspectorate (Scotland), a UK regulatory body for social work and social care services